Spodnja Bačkova is a settlement in the Slovene Hills in the Municipality of Benedikt in northeastern Slovenia. The area is part of the traditional region of Styria. It is now included in the Drava Statistical Region.

A small hexagonal chapel-shrine in the settlement dates to 1871.

References

External links
Spodnja Bačkova at Geopedia

Populated places in the Municipality of Benedikt